Christian literature is the literary aspect of Christian media, and it constitutes a huge body of extremely varied writing.

Scripture
While falling within the strict definition of literature, the Bible is not generally considered literature. However, the Bible has been treated and appreciated as literature; the King James Version in particular has long been considered a masterpiece of English prose, whatever may be thought of its religious significance. Several retellings of the Bible, or parts of the Bible, have also been made with the aim of emphasising its literary qualities.

Christian devotional literature

Devotionals are often used by Christians in order to help themselves grow closer in their relationship with God and learn how to put their faith into practice.

Christian non-fiction
Letters, theological treatises and other instructive and devotional works have been produced by Christian authors since the times of Jesus. For early Christian times almost all writing would be non-fiction, including letters, biblical commentaries, doctrinal works and hagiography. See Patristics.

Since the invention of the printing press non-fictional literature has been used for the dissemination of the Christian message, and also for disseminating different viewpoints within Christianity. The tract (a small pamphlet containing an explanation of some point, or an appeal to the reader) was in use at the time of the Reformation and continues to be used as a part of proselytization.

Christian allegory

Allegory is a style of literature having the form of a story, but using symbolic figures, actions, or representations to express truths—Christian truths, in the case of Christian allegory. Beginning with the parables of Jesus, there has been a long tradition of Christian allegory, including Dante Alighieri's Divine Comedy, John Bunyan's The Pilgrim's Progress, and Hannah Hurnard's Hinds' Feet on High Places.

Christian fiction

Christian fiction is sometimes harder to define than Christian non-fiction. Christian themes are not always explicit. Some Christian fiction, such as that of C. S. Lewis, draws on the allegorical writings of the past. There can also be argument as to whether the works of a Christian author are necessarily Christian fiction. For example, while there are undoubted Christian themes within J. R. R. Tolkien's The Lord of the Rings, they are always kept below the surface. Other possible examples of Christian fiction include the works of G. K. Chesterton and George Macdonald.

In the last few decades the existence of a Christian subculture, particularly in North America, has given rise to a specific genre of Christian novel, written by and for Christians of a particular type (i.e., conservative Evangelical Protestants), and generally with explicit Christian themes. Unlike the works of C.S. Lewis and J.R.R. Tolkien, such novels are often marketed exclusively to Christians and sold in Christian bookshops. The Christy Awards honour excellence in this genre.

In the late 20th century, with the rise of the Christian Right in American society, Christian-themed fiction has thrived. Examples include the works of Tim LaHaye, Jerry B. Jenkins, Frank Peretti, Ted Dekker, Tosca Lee, Randy Alcorn, Francine Rivers, Wayne Thomas Batson, and Janette Oke.

Within the field of Christian fiction smaller niche markets have emerged aimed at specific denominations, notably Catholic fiction and Latter Day Saints Fiction.  There are also Christian fiction that is aimed at wider mainstream audiences, such as the best selling Left Behind series.

Christian poetry

Christian theatre

Throughout the medieval period churches in Europe frequently performed mystery plays, retelling the stories of the Bible. These became widespread in Europe by the end of the fifteenth century. During the fifteenth and sixteenth centuries these developed into the Morality play, an allegorical play intended to exhort the audience to the virtuous life.

In the sixteenth and seventeenth centuries theatre was generally seen as wicked, and the church made attempts to suppress it. In the twentieth century churches, particularly evangelical churches, rediscovered the use of theatre as a form of outreach and as a valid art form.

Christianity & Literature
Christianity & Literature is a peer-reviewed literary periodical, published quarterly, on literature's encounters with Christian thought and history. The journal presupposes no particular theological orientation but respects an orthodox understanding of Christianity as a historically defined faith. It is published by Sage and currently is edited by Mark Eaton, Matthew Smith, and Caleb Spencer, faculty at Azusa Pacific University.

Notable works
(philosophy, plays, lyrical poetry, biography, narrative writings, novels included, most of the theological and hagiographical works are not included )
Bible (c. 1400 BC - AD 100) - numerous authors
The Book of Job in the Bible (c. 1500 - 1000 BC) - unknown author
Psalms in the Bible, hymns, poems (c. 1000 BC) - David
Life of St. Anthony English translation from Greek (c. 360) - Athanasius of Alexandria
The Life of Paulus the First Hermit English translation from Latin (c. 374–375) - St. Jerome
The Life of St. Hilarion English translation from Latin (c. 390) - St. Jerome
The Life of Malchus, the Captive Monk English translation from Latin (c. 391) - St. Jerome
Liber Peristephanon (c. 406) - Prudentius
Psychomachia (c. 406) - Prudentius
The Confessions of St. Augustine (397-398 AD) - Augustine of Hippo
City of God (412) - Augustine of Hippo
The Easter Song English translation from Latin, first epic of Christendom (c. 450) - Coelius Sedulius
De spiritualis historiae gestis English translation from Latin (c. 510) - Avitus of Vienne
The Life of Charlemagne English translation from Latin (c. 825) - Einhard
Life of St Francis of Assisi English translation from Latin (c. 1260) - Bonaventure
Golden Legend English translation from Latin (c. 1260) - Jacobus de Voragine
Summa Theologica (1274) - Thomas Aquinas
The Divine Comedy (1308-1321) - Dante Alighieri
My Secret Book Imaginary dialogue with St Augustine (1343) - Petrarch
Imitation of Christ (1418) - Thomas à Kempis
Christiad (1535) epic - Marco Girolamo Vida
Institutes of the Christian Religion (1536) - John Calvin
The City of the Sun utopian work (1602) - Tommaso Campanella
Lucifer (1654) - Joost van den Vondel
Paradise Lost (1667) - John Milton
Paradise Regained (1671) - John Milton
The Pilgrim's Progress (1678) - John Bunyan
The Lives of the Fathers, Martyrs and Other Principal Saints (1756) hagiography - Alban Butler
The Messiah (1748-1773) - Friedrich Gottlieb Klopstock
Faust (1808) - Johann Wolfgang Goethe
The Christian Faith (1820) - Friedrich Schleiermacher
Cain (1821) - Lord Byron
Heaven and Earth (1821) - Lord Byron
A Christmas Carol (1843) - Charles Dickens
Christiad (1847) epic poem - William Alexander
The Tragedy of Man (1860) (play) - Imre Madách
Moses (1861) (play) - Imre Madách
At the Back of the North Wind (1871) - George MacDonald
The Temptation of Saint Anthony (Flaubert) (1874) - Gustave Flaubert
Daily Light on the Daily Path (c.1875) - published by Bagster & Sons
Ben-Hur: A Tale of the Christ (1880) - Lew Wallace
The Brothers Karamazov (1880) - Fyodor Dostoyevsky
Quo Vadis (1895) (novel) - Henryk Sienkiewicz
In His Steps (1896) - Charles Monroe Sheldon
Orthodoxy (1908) - G. K. Chesterton
The Great Controversy(1911)-Ellen G.White 
Saint Francis of Assisi (1923) - G. K. Chesterton
Joseph and His Brothers (1933 - 1943) - Thomas Mann
The Screwtape Letters (1942) - C. S. Lewis
The Robe (1942) - Lloyd C. Douglas 
The Great Divorce (1945) - C. S. Lewis
Doctor Faustus (1947) - Thomas Mann
The Chronicles of Narnia (1950-1956) - C. S. Lewis
The Holy Sinner (Der Erwählte) (1951) - Thomas Mann
An Angel Comes to Babylon (play) (1953) -  Friedrich Dürrenmatt
Christ Recrucified (The Greek Passion) (1954) -  Nikos Kazantzakis
Hinds' Feet on High Places (1955) -  Hannah Hurnard
The Last Temptation of Christ (1955) (novel) -  Nikos Kazantzakis
Saint Francis (1956) (novel) - Nikos Kazantzakis
The Agony and the Ecstasy (1961) - Irving Stone
The Cross and the Switchblade (1962) - David Wilkerson
The Gold Coffin (1964) - Ferenc Móra
The Master and Margarita (1967) - Mikhail Bulgakov
The God Who Is There - Francis Schaeffer
A Christian Manifesto (1981) - Francis Schaeffer
How Now Shall We Live (1999) - Charles Colson

See also
 American Catholic literature
 Christian Latin literature
 Christian Classics Ethereal Library
 Evangelical Christian Publishers Association
 Evangelical Press Association
 Mennonite literature
 Mormon fiction
 Reformation era literature

References

Matirxmoments Modern Christian Poetry

Further reading
 Brown, Candy G. (2004). The Word in the World: Evangelical Writing, Publishing, and Reading in America, 1789-1880. Chapel Hill, NC: University of North Carolina Press. 352 pages. 
 Harned, David Baily. Theology and the Arts. 1966. Reprint ed., Eugene, OR: Wipf & Stock, 2014.
 Hein, David. "Christianity and the Arts." The Living Church, May 4, 2014, pp. 8–11. (This article presents a theological understanding of the role of the artist in contemporary society. It was the cover story for the Spring Book and Music Issue of this magazine.)
 Moeller, Charles. Littérature du XXe Siècle et Christianisme. Casterman: Paris/Tournai, 6 vols., 1953–1993.
 Nord, David P. (2004). Faith in Reading: Religious Publishing and the Birth of Mass Media in America. New York: Oxford University Press (USA). 222 pages. 
 O'Connor, Leo, F. (1984). Religion in the American Novel. Lanham, MD: University Press of America. 
 Reynolds, David S. (1981). Faith in Fiction: The Emergence of Religious Literature in America. Cambridge, MA: Harvard University Press. 280 pages. 
 Merrell, Richard (2012). Christian Poetry http://www.richardmerrell.com/poetry.pdf